James Dillon (born 29 October 1950) is a Scottish composer who is often regarded as belonging to the New Complexity school. Dillon studied art and design, linguistics, piano, acoustics, Indian rhythm, mathematics and computer music, but is self-taught in composition.

Dillon was born in Glasgow, Scotland. Honours include first prize in the Huddersfield Contemporary Music Festival in 1978, the Kranichsteiner music prize at Darmstadt in 1982, and five Royal Philharmonic Society composition awards, most recently for his chamber piece Tanz/Haus: triptych 2017. Dillon taught at Darmstadt from 1982 to 1992, and has been a guest lecturer and composer at various institutions around the world. He taught at the University of Minnesota School of Music in Minneapolis, Minnesota, from 2007 to 2014.

Selected works 
His major works include choral and vocal music, including the cycle L'évolution du vol (1993) and the opera Philomela (2004), the orchestral works helle Nacht (1987), ignis noster (1992), Via Sacra (2000), and La navette (2001), as well as a violin concerto for Thomas Zehetmair (2000) and the piano concerto Andromeda (2006) for his partner, Noriko Kawai, all showing an ease of writing for large forces. From 1982–2000, Dillon worked on the Nine Rivers cycle, a 3-hour work for voices, strings, percussion, live electronics and computer-generated tape. The epic work was first performed in full in Glasgow, November 2010. Andrew Clements of The Guardian awarded it a full five stars, describing the last movement ("Oceanos") as having a "Wagnerian grandeur" and stating, "The cumulative power of [Nine Rivers] is massive, the range of musical experience vast."

His considerable body of chamber music, often written expressly for a performer's individual abilities, includes solos for clarinet, drumkit, cello, flute, piccolo, guitar, violin, viola, and accordion, alongside eight string quartets (1983, 1991, 1998, 2004, 2008, 2010, 2013, 2017), the five-part Book of Elements for piano (1997–2002) and the soadie waste for piano and string quartet (2002/3). In 2013, Tom Service referred to the Book of Elements as "the most significant contribution to the pianist's repertoire since György Ligeti's Études". His fourth string quartet received the 2005 Royal Philharmonic Society Music Award for Chamber-Scale Composition. He won the same award in 1997 (for Traumwerk, Book 1), 2002 (for The Book of Elements 5), and 2017 (for Tanz/Haus: triptych 2017).

His music has been published by Edition Peters since 1982.

List of compositions 
Source:

Orchestral 
 Windows and Canopies, small orchestra (20 players), 1985
 Überschreiten, small orchestra (16 players), 1986
 Helle Nacht, large orchestra (90 players), 1986–87
 Introitus – Nine Rivers 8, 11/12 strings, fixed media, live electronics, 1989–90
 ignis noster, large orchestra (100 players), 1991–92
 Blitzschlag, flute, large orchestra (66 players), 1988–96
 Via Sacra, large orchestra (80 players), 1999
 Concerto, violin, large orchestra (79 players), 2000
 La Navette, large orchestra, 2000–01
 Physis I & II, large orchestra, 2004–05
 Andromeda, piano, large orchestra (80 players), 2005–06
 torii, small orchestra (17 players), 2009–10
 White Numbers, large orchestra (77 players), 2011
 The Gates, string quartet, large orchestra, 2016
 Circe (Pharmakeia : 3), small orchestra (16 players), 2017

Chamber music 
 Crossing Over, clarinet, 1978
 Ti.re-Ti.ke-Dha, drum kit, 1979
 ...Once upon a Time, alto flute (+ piccolo), oboe (+ English horn), clarinet, bassoon, French horn, trumpet, trombone, double bass, 1980
 Parjanya-Vata, cello, 1981
 East 11th St. NY 10003 – Nine Rivers 1, 6 percussion, 1982
 String Quartet No. 1, 1983
 Zone (...de azul), clarinet, French horn, trumpet, trombone, violin, viola, cello, piano, 1983
 Le Rivage, flute (+ piccolo, alto flute), oboe, clarinet (+ bass clarinet), French horn, bassoon, 1984
 Sgothan, flute, 1984
 Diffraction, piccolo, 1984
 Shrouded Mirrors, guitar, 1988
 Del Cuarto Elemento, violin, 1988
 L'Écran parfum – Nine Rivers 2, 6 violins, 3 percussion, 1988
 La Femme invisible – Nine Rivers 4, flute (+ piccolo), alto flute (+ bass flute), oboe, English horn (+ oboe), clarinet, bass clarinet, 2 soprano saxophones (2nd + alto saxophone), piano, 3 percussion, 1989
 L'Œuvre au noir – Nine Rivers 6, bass flute (+ alto flute, piccolo, triangle), bassoon (+ contrabassoon, crotales), tenor-bass trombone, bass trombone, harp (+ sleigh bells), 2 cellos (1st + rainstick, 2nd + crotales), double bass (+ sleigh bells), 2 percussion, live electronics, 1990
 éileadh sguaibe – Nine Rivers 7, 2 French horns, 2 trumpets, tenor-bass trombone, bass trombone, tuba, 2 percussion, live electronics, 1990
 String Trio, violin, viola, cello, 1990–91
 nuée, bass clarinet, 2 percussion ad libitum, 1991 (section of L'Évolution du vol; may be performed separately)
 String Quartet No. 2, 1991
 Siorram, viola, 1992
 Lumen naturæ, violin, viola, cello, 1992
 Vernal Showers, violin, ensemble (flute [+ piccolo, alto flute], oboe, harp, guitar, mandolin, viola, cello, double bass, harpsichord, percussion), 1992
 L'Ascension, 2 percussion, 1993 (section of L'Évolution du vol; may be performed separately)
 Le Vent, l'arbre et le temps, double bass, 1993 (section of L'Évolution du vol; may be performed separately)
 Redemption, clarinet, violin, piano, 1995
 Traumwerk, Book 1, 2 violins, 1995–96
 Todesengel, clarinet, vibraphone, 1996
 String Quartet No. 3, 1998
 Eos, cello, 1999
 La Coupure – Nine Rivers 5, percussion, live electronics, film, 1989–2000
 Two Studies, accordion, 2001
 Traumwerk, Book 2, violin, harpsichord, 2001
 Traumwerk, Book 3, violin, piano, 2001–02
 The Soadie Waste, piano, string quartet, 2002–03
 The Magic Stick, piano, percussion, 2005
 String Quartet No. 4, 2005
 The Hesperides, cello, piano, 2007
 Theatrum: figuræ, oboe (+ English horn), clarinet (+ contrabass clarinet), bass clarinet, trumpet, trombone, 2 percussion, 2007
 String Quartet No. 5, 2003–08
 The Leuven Triptych, flute, oboe, clarinet, bassoon, trombone, harp, guitar, cello, double bass, piano (+ synthesizer), percussion, live electronics, 2008–09
 String Quartet No. 6, 2010
 Oslo/Triptych, flute (+ piccolo, bass flute, shortwave radio), clarinet (+ E-flat clarinet, bass clarinet, contrabass clarinet, shortwave radio), 2 violins, viola, cello, piano (+ harmonium/synthesizer), percussion (+ shortwave radio, voice transformer), 2011
 New York Triptych, flute (+ piccolo, alto flute, bass flute), oboe (+ English horn), clarinet (+ E-flat clarinet, bass clarinet), violin, viola, cello, piano (+ electronic keyboard), percussion, shortwave radio, fixed media, 2011–12
 String Quartet No. 7, 2013
 Tanz/Haus: triptych 2017, flute, clarinet, electric guitar, violin, cello, double bass, piano, accordion, percussion, 2017
 String Quartet No. 8, 2017
 String Quartet No. 9, 2018
 The Freiburg Diptych, solo violin, tape and live electronics, 2019

Choral 
 Viriditas – Nine Rivers 3, 16 mixed voices, 1993–94
 Oceanos – Nine Rivers 9, 16 mixed voices, orchestra, live electronics, 1985–96
 Hyades, 12 mixed voices, 1998
 residue..., 24 mixed voices, 1998–99
 Vapor (text by Titus Lucretius Carus), 4 mixed voices, string quartet, 1999
 Stabat Mater Dolorosa, 12 mixed voices, 12 players, live electronics, 2014

Vocal 
 Who do you love, female voice, flute (+ piccolo, bass flute), clarinet, violin (+ viola), cello, percussion, 1980–81
 Evening Rain, any voice, 1981
 Come live with me (text from the Song of Solomon), female voice, flute (+ piccolo, alto flute), oboe (+ oboe d'amore, English horn), piano, percussion, 1981–82
 A Roaring Flame (texts by Alexander Carmichael, Clara d'Anduza), female voice, double bass, 1981–82
 Time Lag Zero (text from the Song of Solomon), female voice, viola, 1982
 L'Évolution du vol, female voice (+ hurdy-gurdy), E-flat clarinet (+ bass clarinet, contrabass clarinet), double bass, piano (+ harmonium), 2 percussion, 1991–93 (sections 2–7 of its eight sections may be performed separately: L'Homme et la vérité, female voice, piano; L'Ascension; L'Être-ange, female voice [+ hurdy-gurdy], E-flat clarinet; Nuée; Descente/désir, female voice, bass clarinet, double bass; Le Vent, l'arbre et le temps)
 Temp’est, female voice, flute, piccolo, oboe, bass clarinet, soprano saxophone, bass trombone, percussion (2 players), piano, electric guitar, 2 violins, viola, cello, double bass, 1994
 Philomela (opera in five acts), solo soprano, solo mezzo soprano, solo bass-baritone, chamber ensemble, 2004
 Upon the cloudy night, countertenor, piano, 2009
 The Louth Work: Orphic Fragments, soprano, clarinet, viola, cello, piano, percussion, 2016

Piano 
 Dillug-Kefitsah, 1976
 Spleen, 1980
 black/nebulae, 2 pianos, 1995
 The Book of Elements 1, 1997
 The Book of Elements 3, 2000
 The Book of Elements 2, 2001
 The Book of Elements 4, 2002
 The Book of Elements 5, 2002
 Charm, 2009
 Dragonfly, 2009
 Fujin, 2011

Harpsichord 
 Birl, 1986

References

Further reading 
 Toop, Richard. 2001. "Dillon, James". The New Grove Dictionary of Music and Musicians, 2nd edition, edited by Stanley Sadie and John Tyrrell. London: Macmillan.

External links 
 Entry at The Living Composers Project
 
 Art of the States: the soadie waste world premiere performance of Dillon work

1950 births
Living people
20th-century classical composers
20th-century British composers
20th-century British male musicians
20th-century Scottish musicians
21st-century classical composers
21st-century British composers
21st-century British male musicians
British classical composers
British male classical composers
Scottish classical composers